Babis Bizas (born Charalampos Bizas; 16 September 1954) is a travel writer, explorer, and geographer. He participated in an expedition to the North Pole in May 1996, and 18 years later, in December 2014, he landed on the South Pole, thus probably becoming the only Greek to have visited both Poles. By 2004 Bizas had visited all 193 sovereign countries of the world. He is currently a member of the RGO (Russian Geographic Society).

Recognitions

"The most traveled man on Earth".

Early life

He studied Political Sciences at the Panteion University of Social and Political Sciences in Athens and Slavonic languages in the Institute for Balkan Studies in Thessaloniki, where he learned Bulgarian and Russian.
As a university student, he travelled as backpacker in Europe mostly hitchhiking and in 1977 he followed the stream of the young European travelers.

Books
Babis Bizas has written two travel books. The "Russia" Guide and the "Geographic Guide for Travelers"

References

External links

 Babis Bizas Travelers Century Club Member Reaches the Two Poles 
 recovered from the prototype http://www.cosmorama.gr/en/articles/interview-with-babis-bizas--our-own-magellan-.html in 20-09-2020   
 Ekathimerini Babis Bizas the most travelled man in the World 
 Greeks of diaspora 

1954 births
Living people
Panteion University alumni
Greek writers
20th-century travel writers
21st-century travel writers
Greek travel writers
People from Arta, Greece